Wemple is an unincorporated community in DeSoto Parish, Louisiana, United States.

References

Unincorporated communities in DeSoto Parish, Louisiana
Unincorporated communities in Louisiana